The Bosnian Democratic Party of Croatia (BDSH) is a left wing Croatian political party representing the Bosniak minority. Its president Nedžad Hodžić won the special seat of the Bosniak and other minorities in the Croatian parliamentary election, 2011.

References

Bosniak political parties
Political parties of minorities in Croatia
Political parties established in 2008
Bosniaks of Croatia